KBRV (800 AM) is a radio station broadcasting a country music format. Licensed to Soda Springs, Idaho, United States, the station is currently owned by Val Cook, through licensee Old West Media, Inc.

KBRV was originally on 540 kHz, changed to 790 kHz in 1966 and moved to 800 kHz on April 25, 2013.

References

External links
 Official Website
FCC History Cards for KBRV

BRV
Country radio stations in the United States
Classic country radio stations in the United States